Martha Whitmore Hickman (December 9, 1925January 17, 2015) was an American author.

Hickman grew up in Massachusetts.  She received her B.A. in English literature, Phi Beta Kappa, from Mount Holyoke College in 1947. She was the author of a number of inspirational and other self-help books. She was a Christian.

References

External links

HarperCollins biography
Bibliography 1
Bibliography 2

1925 births
2015 deaths
Writers from Massachusetts
American self-help writers
Mount Holyoke College alumni
People from Nashville, Tennessee
People from Los Altos, California
20th-century American women writers
20th-century American non-fiction writers
American women non-fiction writers
21st-century American women